František Máka (born 27 September 1968 in Jičín) is a former Czech nordic combined skier who competed from 1990 to 1997. Competing in two Winter Olympics in the 3 × 10 km team event, he finished sixth in 1992 and fifth in 1994.

Máka's best finish at the FIS Nordic World Ski Championships was sixth at Val di Fiemme in 1991. His best World Cup career finish was fourth in a 15 km individual event in Czechoslovakia in 1990.

External links
 Profile at Sports-Reference.com
 

1968 births
Living people
Nordic combined skiers at the 1992 Winter Olympics
Nordic combined skiers at the 1994 Winter Olympics
Czech male Nordic combined skiers
Olympic Nordic combined skiers of Czechoslovakia
Czechoslovak male Nordic combined skiers
Olympic Nordic combined skiers of the Czech Republic
Czechoslovak male skiers
Czech male skiers
People from Jičín
Sportspeople from the Hradec Králové Region